Falling in Love Again may refer to:

Film 
 Falling in Love Again (1980 film), a romantic comedy starring Elliott Gould
 Falling in Love Again (2003 film), a Canadian animated short

Music

Albums
 Falling in Love Again (David Gates album), 1980
 Falling in Love Again (Davitt Sigerson album), 1984

Songs
 "Falling in Love Again" (Anika Moa song), 2002
 "Falling in Love Again" (Eagle-Eye Cherry song), 1998
 "Falling in Love Again" (Marvin Gaye song), 1977
 "Falling in Love Again (Can't Help It)", composed by Frederick Hollander and Sammy Lerner, 1930
 "Falling in Love Again", by Anjulie
 "Falling in Love Again", by Celine Dion from Courage

See also
 Falling in love (disambiguation)